New Jersey Rangers is an American soccer team based in Denville, New Jersey, United States. Founded in 2010, the team plays in the W-League, the second tier of Women's Soccer in America, in the Northeast Division of the Eastern Conference.

The team is a sister squad of the PDL's New Jersey Rangers.

Players

2010 roster

Notable former players

Year-by-year

Stadia
 Stadium at Morris Catholic High School; Denville, New Jersey (2010–present)

External links
 New Jersey Rangers on USL Soccer

   

Association football clubs established in 2010
Women's soccer clubs in New Jersey
USL W-League (1995–2015) teams
2010 establishments in New Jersey
Denville Township, New Jersey

nl:New Jersey Rangers